Frolov, or Frolova (feminine; Фролова) is a Russian surname that is derived from the male given name Frol and literally means Frol's. It may refer to:

People
 Aleksandr Frolov (born 1964), Russian oligarch, CEO of multinational steel company Evraz
 Alexander Frolov (born 1982), Russian ice hockey player
 Andre Frolov (born 1988), Estonian football player
 Artur Frolov (born 1970), Ukrainian chess master
 Diane Frolov, American screenwriter
 Dmitri Frolov, Soviet ice hockey player
 Dmitrii Frolov, Russian film director
 Eduard Frolov, Russian historian
 Kostyantyn Frolov (born 1972), Ukrainian football player and manager
 Nicolae Frolov (1876–1948), Romanian geologist and agronomist
 Pyotr Frolov (1775–1839), Russian mining engineer and inventor
 Stanislav Frolov, Russian soloist with the Alexandrov Ensemble
 Valerian Frolov (1895–1961), Soviet Colonel General
 Vasili Frolov (1923–2006), Soviet aircraft pilot and Hero of the Soviet Union
Vladimir Frolov, Russian major general 
 Vladislav Frolov (born 1980), Russian sprint athlete

Other
Frolov Chakra, an aircraft maneuver

Russian-language surnames